The 2008 AFF Futsal Championship was held in Bangkok, Thailand from 27 August to 31 August 2008.

Hosts Thailand have sent their under-21 team for this tournament as their senior team were preparing for the FIFA Futsal World Cup.  While Laos are making their debut in this competition.

Tournament 
All times are Thailand Standard Time (TST) - UTC+7

Group stage

Group A

Group B

Knockout stage

Bracket

Semi-finals

Third place play-off

Final

Winner

Goalscorers 

7 goals
 Topas Pamungkas

6 goals
 Mohd Fadhil Yusoff
 Suphawut Thueanklang

5 goals
 Kritsada Wongkaeo

4 goals
 Deny Handoyo
 Mohd Fadhil Karnim

3 goals
 Jasriman Johari
 Mohd Hardyman Lamit
 Afif Taminy
 Addie Azwan Zainal
 Aung Moe
 Maung Maung Myint
 Jadet Punpoem
 Truong Quoc Tuan

2 goals
 Faizul Zainy
 Asrul Asdynee Sahdon
 Achmad Syaibani
 Sayan Karmadi
 Anakone Sayakone
 Valasine Dalaphone

2 goals
 Safar Mohamad
 Mohd Ruzaley
 Soe Min Oo
 Misagh Bahadoran
 Ariel Zerrudo
 Jirawat Sornwichian
 Thanakorn Penpakul
 Nattawut Kongnimit
 Huynh Ba Tuan
 Nguyen Quang Minh

1 goal
 unknown
 unknown
 Mohd Shahril Ismail
 Ranozakhran Tajuddin
 Jaelani Ladjanibi
 Sukma Nagara
 Fachry Assegaf
 Maulana Ihsan
 Vidalack Souvanhavongsa
 Phetsamay Thongmany
 Etdy Douangmatphon
 Phonepaseuth Sysoutham
 Jamhauri Zainuddin
 Mohd Saiful Mohd Noor
 Muizzuddin Mohd Haris

1 goal
 Ahmad Hanif Sarmin
 N. Saravanan
 Aung Kyaw Oo
 Min Oo
 Ali Go
 unknown
 Nuttapun Namboonmee
 Nattawut Madyalan
 Pham Minh Giang

Own goal
 Noor Karim (for Vietnam)
 Ariel Zerrudo (for Indonesia)

References 
General
"AFF Futsal Championship 2008" ASEAN Football Federation.

Specific

External links
 Old website (Archived)
 Official website

Fut
Aff Futsal Championship, 2008
AFF Futsal Championship
2008
Fut